Borgomezzavalle is a comune (municipality) in the Province of Verbano-Cusio-Ossola in the Italian region Piedmont. As of 2019 the population was 320.

It was established on 1 January 2016 by the merger of the municipalities of Seppiana and Viganella.

Borgomezzavalle borders the following municipalities: Antrona Schieranco, Calasca-Castiglione, Montescheno, Pallanzeno, Villadossola.

In January 2019, in order to reverse the declining population in the village, Alberto Preioni, mayor of Borgomezzavalle, announced a plan to sell abandoned mountain cottages for just €1, (about US$1.20). With the purchase comes the obligation to renovate the building, there is no residency requirement. He also offered to pay families €1,000 for each new baby born in the village and €2,000 to someone starting a new business and who registers for VAT.

References 

Borgomezzavalle